Oreoneta is a genus of dwarf spiders that was first described by C. Chyzer & Władysław Kulczyński in 1894.

Species
 it contains thirty species:
Oreoneta alpina (Eskov, 1987) – Russia
Oreoneta arctica (Holm, 1960) – Russia (mainland, Kurile Is.), USA (Alaska)
Oreoneta banffkluane Saaristo & Marusik, 2004 – Canada
Oreoneta beringiana Saaristo & Marusik, 2004 – Russia (mainland, Kurile Is.), USA (Alaska), Canada
Oreoneta brunnea (Emerton, 1882) – USA, Canada
Oreoneta eskimopoint Saaristo & Marusik, 2004 – USA, Canada, Greenland
Oreoneta eskovi Saaristo & Marusik, 2004 – Russia, Kazakhstan
Oreoneta fennica Saaristo & Marusik, 2004 – Finland
Oreoneta fortyukon Saaristo & Marusik, 2004 – USA (Alaska), Canada
Oreoneta frigida (Thorell, 1872) (type) – Greenland to Norway
Oreoneta garrina (Chamberlin, 1949) – USA, Canada
Oreoneta herschel Saaristo & Marusik, 2004 – Canada
Oreoneta intercepta (O. Pickard-Cambridge, 1873) – Russia
Oreoneta kurile Saaristo & Marusik, 2004 – Russia (Kurile Is.)
Oreoneta leviceps (L. Koch, 1879) – Russia (Europe, Siberia), USA (Alaska), Canada
Oreoneta logunovi Saaristo & Marusik, 2004 – Russia
Oreoneta magaputo Saaristo & Marusik, 2004 – Russia, Canada
Oreoneta mineevi Saaristo & Marusik, 2004 – Russia
Oreoneta mongolica (Wunderlich, 1995) – Mongolia
Oreoneta montigena (L. Koch, 1872) – Germany, Switzerland, Italy to Slovakia, Bulgaria
Oreoneta punctata (Tullgren, 1955) – Sweden, Finland, Russia
Oreoneta repeater Saaristo & Marusik, 2004 – Canada
Oreoneta sepe Saaristo & Marusik, 2004 – Canada
Oreoneta sinuosa (Tullgren, 1955) – Norway, Sweden, Finland, Russia
Oreoneta tatrica (Kulczyński, 1915) – Central Europe
Oreoneta tienshangensis Saaristo & Marusik, 2004 – Kazakhstan, China
Oreoneta tuva Saaristo & Marusik, 2004 – Russia
Oreoneta uralensis Saaristo & Marusik, 2004 – Russia (Europe, Siberia, Far East)
Oreoneta vogelae Saaristo & Marusik, 2004 – USA
Oreoneta wyomingia Saaristo & Marusik, 2004 – USA, Canada

See also
 List of Linyphiidae species (I–P)

References

Araneomorphae genera
Linyphiidae
Spiders of Asia
Spiders of North America